Melenchuk is a Ukrainian-language surname. The Romanian-language spelling of the surname is Melenciuc. Notable people with the surname include:

Jim Melenchuk (born 1953) Canadian politician
 (1871–1917) a politician from Bessarabia, Russian Empire
Alexandru Melenciuc (born 1979), Moldovan footballer

Romanian-language surnames
Ukrainian-language surnames